Two ships of the French Navy have borne the name Jauréguiberry, in honour of Bernard Jauréguiberry: 

  (1893–1934), a battleship
  (1955–1992), a destroyer

Sources and references 
 NetMarine

French Navy ship names